How to Write Love Songs is the only studio album of the short lived rock supergroup Mass Mental?. It was released solely in Japan, and has only gained attention worldwide due to internet uploads and imported CDs. A limited run was released in March 2016.

Background
Mass Mental came into being in 1998 after bassist Robert Trujillo, then of Suicidal Tendencies, began auditioning for a new side project. There he met up with Welsh musician Benji Webbe, whose ragga-punk outfit Dub War had just disbanded following poor sales of their second album and disputes with Earache Records, who had also refused Webbe a solo album. The group was rounded out with second bassist Armand Sabal-Lecco and drummer Brooks Wackerman. Skindred guitarist Mikey Demus claims that the late Snot frontman Lynn Strait performed on the album in one of his final recordings before his death. The album was released in Japan in memory of Lynn.

Track List

Personnel
Mass Mental?
Benji Webbe - vocals
Robert Trujillo - bass guitar, mixing
Armand Sabal-Lecco - bass guitar
Brooks Wackerman - drums, vocals on Speedmental

Additional Personnel
Roy Mayorga - drums, percussion
Lynn Strait - vocals
Danny Carbonel - vocals on Bounce
Joey Castillo - "additional beats" on Frog Stomp
John Wackerman - "Great Vibes" on I Win
Danny Reyes - percussion on I Win
Rick Battson - "Electric Mierda (Caca)" on Bad Vibes
Stephen Perkins - drums on Lifeline
Joey Klparda - percussion on Lifeline
Whitfield Crane - growls on Kill Ya
Cover artwork by Pascal Brun, Comenius Röthlisberger and Boris Zatko (TeamSwitzerland.com)
Mark Dodson - production, engineering, mixing
Mark Casselman - mastering, additional engineering, additional mixing
D. Dunn - mixing
Dave Draper - remastering (2016 "Ghetto Bootleg Edition" remaster)

References

1998 debut albums
Mass Mental albums